The following are schools that field collegiate teams in rifle in the NCAA.  Since there are only 23 Division I schools, 3 Division II schools, and 3 Division III schools that sponsor rifle, the NCAA holds only a single National Collegiate championship.  There are 2 men's teams, 9 women's teams, and 22 mixed/co-ed teams (the number of teams exceeds the number of schools because four schools field two teams).

References

Rifle
College rifle teams in the United States
Sport shooting-related lists